Straus National Bank and Trust Company may refer to one of two former bank organizations:

 Straus National Bank and Trust Company (Chicago)
 Straus National Bank and Trust Company (New York)